HLA-DR53 is an HLA-DR serotype that recognizes gene products of HLA-DRB4 locus. There are 13 alleles at this locus that encode 7 proteins.

DRB3, DRB4, and DRB5 are minor DR beta encoding loci, they have been recognized as having distinct evolution. and the DRB4 locus presence is linked to HLA-DR7 seropositivity. The DRB4*locus was apparently duplicated from an ancestor of the DRB1-DRB4 common locus around 5 million years ago.

DRB4 locus is only apparent in a small subset of DQ haplotypes, and most individuals lack DRB4. In addition the level of normal expression is 8 fold lower than the DRB1 in cells which can express both. and lowered because of both transcriptional and post-transcriptional regulation.

Alleles

DR53 reactive alleles: DRB4*0101, *0103

Unknown reactivity: *0102, *0104 to *0107

Null alleles: *0101102N, *01030102N, *0201N, *0301N

Associated diseases

DRB4*01 is positively associated with Erythema multiforme, Crohn's disease, myasthenia gravis, rheumatoid arthritis Hashimoto's thyroiditis, vitiligo, primary biliary cirrhosis, clozapine-induced agranulocytosis, Vogt–Koyanagi–Harada disease,

HLA-DRB1 linkage
HLA-DR53 serotypes (HLA-DRB4) is linked to the following HLADR serotypes (HLA-DRB1) allele groups:

HLA-DR4 - DRB1*04

HLA-DR7 - DRB1*07

HLA-DR9 - DRB1*09

References

HLA-DR haplotypes